Anupam Joshi is the Oros Family Professor and Chair of CSEE Department in the University of Maryland Baltimore County, Baltimore, MD. He is also the Director of the UMBC Center for Cybersecurity and heads the Accelerated Cognitive Cybersecurity Lab. He is regarded as a leading expert in cybersecurity.

He was named Fellow of the Institute of Electrical and Electronics Engineers (IEEE) in 2015 for contributions to security, privacy and data management in mobile and pervasive systems.

He was named Fellow of the American Council on Education (ACE) for 2022-23

Early life
Anupam Joshi was born in New Delhi to famous Hindi author Manohar Shyam Joshi and Dr. Bhagwati Joshi. His initial schooling was from Modern School, New Delhi. He earned his undergraduate degree in Electrical Engineering from IIT Delhi and a PhD in Computer Science from Purdue University.

Career
Prior to joining the UMBC, he held positions at the University of Missouri, and Purdue University. He is also a Visiting Faculty at the Center of Excellence in Cyber Security and Information Assurance, IIT Delhi. He is the author of more than 300 refereed publications and has received research grants and contracts from a variety of sources.

References 

Fellow Members of the IEEE
Living people
University of Maryland, Baltimore County faculty
Purdue University alumni
IIT Delhi
Year of birth missing (living people)
American electrical engineers